Umberto Bruni (24 November 1914 – 1 February 2021) was a Canadian artist and painter. He served as director of the Académie Internationale des Beaux-Arts du Québec.

Biography
Bruni was born in Montreal to an Italian family. He learned how to decorate murals and stained glass at the age of 13 after studying Guido Nincheri. He studied at the École des beaux-arts de Montréal from 1930 to 1938. In 1972, he became curator of the gallery at the Université du Québec à Montréal. During the restoration of painting in the National Assembly of Quebec in 1975, a painting of Philippe-Honoré Roy was found to be missing, so Bruni was tasked with its re-creation, which would be completed in 1980 using photographs. He was famous for designing many Catholic buildings across Quebec and for creating a bust of André Bessette. He has also painted portraits for many organizations and specializing in oil paintings. He held personal expositions at the Maison des Arts de Laval and the Centre Leonardo Da Vinci. He was a member of the International Institute for Conservation and the Royal Canadian Academy of Arts.

Umberto Bruni died in Laval on 1 February 2021 at the age of 106.

Collections
National Assembly of Quebec
Université de Montréal
Séminaire de Québec
Saint Joseph's Oratory
Musée des hospitalières de l'Hotel Dieu de Montréal
Musée régional de Vaudreuil-Soulanges

References

1914 births
2021 deaths
Canadian male artists
Canadian centenarians
Canadian people of Italian descent
Artists from Montreal
Men centenarians